Hedriodiscus is a genus of flies in the family Stratiomyidae.

Species
Hedriodiscus binotatus (Loew, 1866)
Hedriodiscus chloraspis (Wiedemann, 1830)
Hedriodiscus clypeatus (Bigot, 1879)
Hedriodiscus dorsalis (Fabricius, 1805)
Hedriodiscus euchlorus (Gerstaecker, 1857)
Hedriodiscus humilis (Lindner, 1929)
Hedriodiscus hydrolupus (Lindner, 1949)
Hedriodiscus infrapallidus (Lindner, 1951)
Hedriodiscus jacarellus (Lindner, 1949)
Hedriodiscus lefebvrei (Macquart, 1838)
Hedriodiscus leucogaster (James, 1933)
Hedriodiscus lineatus (Fabricius, 1805)
Hedriodiscus nudifrons James, 1953
Hedriodiscus pallidiventris (Macquart, 1846)
Hedriodiscus prasinus (Jaennicke, 1867)
Hedriodiscus pulcher (Wiedemann, 1824)
Hedriodiscus punctifer (Bigot, 1879)
Hedriodiscus quadrilineatus (Macquart, 1834)
Hedriodiscus subcupratus (Walker, 1854)
Hedriodiscus superpictus (Lindner, 1949)
Hedriodiscus tortugellus (Lindner, 1949)
Hedriodiscus trivittatus (Say, 1829)
Hedriodiscus truquii (Bellardi, 1859)
Hedriodiscus turacellus (Lindner, 1949)
Hedriodiscus varipes (Loew, 1866)
Hedriodiscus vertebratus (Say, 1824)

References

Stratiomyidae
Brachycera genera
Taxa named by Günther Enderlein
Diptera of South America
Diptera of North America